Miss Rhodesia  was the national beauty pageant of Rhodesia and its antecedents. It debuted in Miss World in 1959, but was not allowed to participate after Rhodesia's Unilateral Declaration of Independence in 1965. When Rhodesia transitioned to a majority democracy and became Zimbabwe in 1980, Miss Rhodesia became Miss Zimbabwe.

History 
Miss Rhodesia was established as Miss Rhodesia and Nyasaland in 1959. The winner debuted at Miss World 1959, with Vivien Lentin placing as a semifinalist. In 1960, Jenny Lee Scott appeared at Miss World. In 1961, there were two "Miss Rhodesias," when Angela Moorcroft competed at Miss World representing Rhodesia and Nyasaland, and Jonee Sierra representing Southern Rhodesia at Miss Universe. In 1965, Lesley Bunting represented Rhodesia at Miss World 1965, just days after the country declared independence from the United Kingdom. Despite this, Bunting was still able to participate, and she was a Top 7 Finalist that year.

After 1965, Miss Rhodesia was no longer allowed to participate in Miss World, due to Rhodesia's political situation. Despite this, in 1972 the English-born Miss Rhodesia attempted to travel to Britain to compete in Miss World, but was barred entry, despite her British citizenship. Four years later, when Miss Rhodesia Jane Bird flew to London and attempted to participate in Miss World 1976, she was prevented by the organization. In 1980, when Rhodesia reverted to a British colony and was renamed Zimbabwe, Miss Rhodesia ended and was succeeded by Miss Zimbabwe

List of titleholders 
Helen Elliott and Myra Fowler held the Miss Rhodesia title, but the sources do not include the year.

References 

1959 establishments in Southern Rhodesia
1980 disestablishments in Zimbabwe
Beauty pageants in Zimbabwe
Rhodesia
Rhodesia
Recurring events established in 1959
Recurring events disestablished in 1980
Women in Rhodesia
Rhodesian culture